Chaney Kley Minnis (August 20, 1972 – July 24, 2007) was an American actor. During his career he was best known for his recurring role as Officer Asher on the FX drama The Shield and as the lead in the horror movie Darkness Falls.

Early life
Chaney Kley Minnis was born August 20, 1972, in Manassas, Virginia and raised in Denver, Colorado. He attended Denver's Thomas Jefferson High School, and the University of Colorado in Boulder, Colorado, where he earned a BFA in drama. After graduating from college, Kley relocated to Chicago where he began working as a stage actor. Kley starred in a 1998 Chicago Dramatists' production of The Angels of Lemnos, for which he won a Joseph Jefferson Award for Best Actor.

Career
Chaney first appeared on the television series, Buffy the Vampire Slayer, appearing on the episode "Real Me". In 2001, he made his film debut portraying Brandon in Legally Blonde. In 2003, Kley portrayed Kyle Walsh in the horror-thriller movie Darkness Falls. He then later appeared on NCIS, Cold Case, CSI: Crime Scene Investigation, as well as Las Vegas. Kley's last film was One Way to Valhalla (2009).

Death
Kley died on July 24, 2007, in Venice, Los Angeles. According to his father, the likely cause was sleep apnea. After an autopsy was performed, the cause of death was discovered to be a drug overdose, stated by his father afterward. He was buried in Denver.

Filmography

Film

Television

References

External links

1972 births
2007 deaths
American male film actors
American male stage actors
American male television actors
Drug-related deaths in California
Male actors from Denver
Male actors from Virginia
University of Colorado alumni
People from Manassas, Virginia
20th-century American male actors